Thomas James O’Brien (July 30, 1842 – May 19, 1933) was a politician and diplomat from the U.S. state of Michigan.

O'Brien was born in Jackson, Michigan, on July 30, 1842, the son of Timothy O'Brien and Elizabeth Lander O'Brien. On September 4, 1873, he married Delia Howard (July 14, 1848 - January 22, 1926).

O'Brien was a lawyer by profession and a Republican politician. In 1883 he was an unsuccessful candidate for the office of Justice of the Michigan Supreme Court. In 1896 and 1904 he was a delegate to the Republican National Convention from Michigan.

Ambassador

O’Brien, a graduate of the University of Michigan law school, held the following posts as ambassador of the United States:

Denmark, 1905–1907 (appointed by President Theodore Roosevelt)
Japan, 1907–1911 (appointed by President Theodore Roosevelt)
Italy, 1911–1913 (appointed by President William Howard Taft)

Death

O’Brien died on May 19, 1933. He is buried with his wife at Oakhill Cemetery in Grand Rapids, Michigan.

References

Sources
The Political Graveyard: Thomas O’Brien
United States Department of State: Chiefs of Mission by Country, 1778-2005

External links

Ambassadors of the United States to Denmark
Ambassadors of the United States to Italy
Ambassadors of the United States to Japan
1842 births
1933 deaths
Politicians from Jackson, Michigan
Burials in Michigan
University of Michigan Law School alumni
20th-century American diplomats